Rauenberg may refer to:
 Rauenberg, Kraichgau, Baden-Württemberg, Germany
 Rauenberg (Freudenstadt), Germany
 Rauenberg (Berlin), Germany